Kleshchenko (Ukrainian or Russian: Клещенко) is a gender-neutral Ukrainian surname that may refer to

Aleksandr Kleshchenko (born 1995), Russian football player
Evgeny Kleshchenko (born 1992), Russian BMX rider
Nicky Cleșcenco (born 2001), Moldovan football player
Serghei Cleșcenco (born 1972), Moldovan football player

See also
 

Ukrainian-language surnames